CICP may refer to:

CICP-FM, a Native Communications station in Cranberry Portage, Manitoba, Canada
Central Institute for Correctional Police, a law enforcement educational institution in Baoding City, Hebei, China
Coding-independent code points, a way to signal the properties of a video or audio stream
Countermeasures Injury Compensation Program, an entity within the Healthcare Systems Bureau